Norton Cecil Michael Knatchbull, 6th Baron Brabourne (11 February 192215 September 1943), was a British peer and soldier, the son of The 5th Baron Brabourne, Governor of Bengal.

Early life
Knatchbull was educated at Eton College and the Royal Military College, Sandhurst, and served briefly as a soldier in The Buffs (The Royal East Kent Regiment) in 1940 before being commissioned into the Grenadier Guards during the Second World War.

Capture and death
Lord Brabourne was wounded and captured by the Germans in Italy in 1943. On his way to captivity in Germany he tried to escape from the prison train at Bronzolo, a village in South Tyrol, together with Arnold Guy Vivian, a fellow officer in the 6th Battalion, Grenadier Guards. Both were recaptured and executed by the SS in Bronzolo on 15 September 1943.

Brabourne was buried in the Padua War Cemetery in Italy. He died unmarried, and his titles passed to his younger brother, John Knatchbull.

References

External links

CWGC Grave record

1922 births
1943 deaths
People educated at Eton College
Graduates of the Royal Military College, Sandhurst
6
Norton
Grenadier Guards officers
British people executed by Nazi Germany
Deaths by firearm in Italy
World War II prisoners of war held by Germany
British Army personnel killed in World War II
People executed by Nazi Germany by firearm
Eldest sons of British hereditary barons
Buffs (Royal East Kent Regiment) soldiers
British World War II prisoners of war